Kolachi may refer to
   
 An old name for Karachi, Pakistan
 Kolachi (port), a former port at Karachi, Pakistan
 Kolachi, Dadu, a village in Mehar Tehsil, Dadu District, Pakistan
 Kalachi, Kazakhstan, a rural locality in Esil District, Akmola Region, Kazakhstan
 Mai Kolachi (Lady Kolachi), legendary fisherwoman and namesake of Karachi, Pakistan

See also
 
 Kulachi, a town and Kulachi Tehsil in Pakistan
 Kolach (cake), a central-European pastry sometimes known as Kolache
 Colachi, a volcano in Chile